Paweł Janik (born 4 April 1949) is a Polish footballer. He played in one match for the Poland national football team in 1970.

References

External links
 

1949 births
Living people
Polish footballers
Poland international footballers
Place of birth missing (living people)
Association football midfielders